The Bahawalpur Central Library, also known as Sadiq Reading Library, is a library in Bahawalpur, Punjab, Pakistan. The library was founded on 8 March 1924 by Sir Rufus Daniel Issacs during the coronation year of Sadeq Mohammad Khan V. costing 100,000 Rupees by Bahawalpur State and is second largest in the province of Punjab.

Architecture 

The library is one of the buildings, built by the Nawabs that was designed in a hybrid Neo-Gothic - Victorian style. Unlike other royal buildings, arches in the library are not multi-foiled, but are instead single-foiled.

A porch wraps around some of the building, and has an octagonal tower with Jali work on its arches, and stylized Victorian scrolls at its base.

Collections 
The library is divided into three sections: Main Hall, children's books section and an audio visual archive section. The library also has older editions of newspapers. It has over 100,000 books, and contains a repository of historic documents related to the state of Bahawalpur and of Khwaja Ghulam Farid.

References

External links 

 Lets go:Bahawalpur library BBC Urdu

Libraries in Punjab, Pakistan
Buildings and structures in Bahawalpur
Bahawalpur (princely state)
1924 establishments in British India
Libraries established in 1924
Tourist attractions in Bahawalpur